Alexander Cameron Sim  (28 August 1840 – 28 November 1900) was a British-born pharmacist and entrepreneur active in Japan during the Meiji period. He was also the founder of the Kobe Regatta & Athletic Club. He is the creator of the Ramune soft drink.

Biography
Sim was born in Aberlour, Scotland in 1840. He relocated to London in his youth, and received a post as a pharmacist at the Royal London Hospital in 1862. In 1866, he volunteered for an overseas assignment, and was sent to the Royal Naval Hospital in Hong Kong, where he spent the next 3.5 years. In late 1869, he moved to Nagasaki, Japan, where he resided in the treaty port, but moved to Kobe in 1870, where he initially worked as a pharmacist for the foreign firm Llewellyn Shōkai. However, he began his own company, AC Sim Shōkai, later the same year. Sim's company specialized in the import and distribution of medicines and medical supplies. In 1884, Sim introduced a carbonated beverage based on lemonade to the Kobe foreign settlement. This drink, called "mabu soda" for "marble soda" due to the marbles placed in the bottle for opening action, soon became very popular with the local Japanese after it was advertised in the Tokyo Mainichi Newspaper as a preventative for cholera. The drink remains a popular soft drink, sold worldwide, under the name of ramune to this day.

Sim was a strong supporter of athletic activities, and founded the Kobe Regatta & Athletic Club on 23 September 1870. He also organized a volunteer firefighting organization within the foreign community, and built a fire lookout tower near his residence. He also organized relief and community support efforts in the aftermath of the 1891 Mino–Owari earthquake and the 1896 Sanriku earthquake.

Sim died on 28 November 1900 of typhoid fever. He is buried in the Kobe Foreign cemetery on Mount Futatabi.

References
Murphy, Kevin C. The American merchant experience in nineteenth-century Japan. Routledge (2002)

External links
Kobe Regatta & Athletic Club

1840 births
1900 deaths
Scottish expatriates in Japan
People of Meiji-period Japan
Deaths from typhoid fever
Infectious disease deaths in Japan
19th-century Scottish businesspeople